Paramax is the trade name for Paracetamol/metoclopramide.

Paramax may also refer to:

 A business unit of L-3 Communications
 A computer game for the Commodore Amiga

See also